New York's 25th State Assembly district is one of 150 districts of the New York State Assembly. It is currently represented by Assembly member  Nily Rozic. (D,WF).

Geography 

The 25th State Assembly district spans the northeast portions of Queens, including the neighborhoods of Flushing, Queensboro Hill, Hillcrest, Fresh Meadows, Oakland Gardens, Bayside, and Douglaston.

Recent election results

2022

2020

2018

2016

2014

2012

2010

Past Assemblymembers
 Rory I. Lancman (2006-2012)
 Brian McLaughlin (1992 - 2006)

References

25